Green and Silver is the account by Tom Rolt of a voyage through the inland waterways of Ireland just after the Second World War, published in 1949. It is notable because it was one of the last trips by any boat around the triangular loop of the River Shannon, Grand Canal and Royal Canal before the last named was closed to navigation. It was reopened in 2010.

"This voyage of ours over the silver waters and through the green fields of Ireland has brought us both a precious store of memories which will remain with us always; nor will we ever forget the kindliness and the welcome that we found there."(p253)

Background
L. T. C. Rolt's book Narrowboat (1944) had set in motion a revival of interest in the canals of Britain. In 1946, after reading an account by Samuel Smiles of the origins of the Royal Canal in Ireland, he and his wife Angela decided to explore its waterways. As using his narrow boat in Ireland was impossible (it was too long for the locks on the Grand Canal) he set about finding a smaller boat, ending up with a  cruiser rented in Athlone. The schedule was tight as the locks to the River Liffey in Dublin from both Royal and Grand Canals were due to close for maintenance and the supply of petrol for pleasure boating was uncertain.

They overcame the obstacles and managed to complete their journey, which included the length of the Shannon from Lough Allen in the north to Killaloe and Limerick in the south (although they didn't take the boat to the limits). As with all of Tom Rolt's books, there is a deep feeling for the history and techniques of his subject matter and a certain amount of philosophizing—which was expressed most fully in his High Horse Riderless published the following year.

The itinerary at the back includes a full list of locks and bridges, with distances, on the waterways covered.

Contents
The Journey is planned
Introduction to Ireland: Athlone and Lough Ree
Galway and Connemara
The voyage begins: Athlone to Shannon Harbour
Clonfert and Banagher
The Grand Canal: Shannon Harbour to Tullamore
The Grand Canal: Tullamore to Dublin
Dublin
The Royal Canal: Spencer Dock to Mullingar
The Royal Canal: Mullingar to the Shannon
The Upper Shannon and the River Boyle
Battlebridge, Lough Allen and a Regatta
An Interlude Ashore: Drumshambo and Sligo
Down River: Jamestown to Portumna
Lough Derg: Portumna to Killaloe
Killaloe and Limerick
Back to Athlone
Farewell to Ireland
Itinerary

Reception
"Green and Silver became a classic and was an important element in the campaign launched by the small group who founded the Inland Waterways Association of Ireland to save the Shannon navigation from strangulation by low bridges. It captures for all time the waterways as they were then and his enchantment at what he experienced shines through strongly." (Ruth Delany, author of many books on Irish waterways.)

The round trip of the Shannon and two canals has since been dubbed the "Green and Silver Route" and the book continues to be available.

References

 

1949 non-fiction books
Canals in Ireland
Irish non-fiction books